Egon Johansen (field hockey)
 Egon Johansen (footballer)